Caccia al tesoro is a 2017 Italian comedy film directed by Carlo Vanzina.

It was Vanzina's last film before his death in July 2018.

Cast
Vincenzo Salemme as Domenico Greco
Carlo Buccirosso as Ferdinando
Christiane Filangieri as Claudia
Serena Rossi as Rosetta
Max Tortora as Cesare
Gennaro Guazzo as Gennarino
Pippo Lorusso as the security guard
Francesco Di Leva as O' Mastino
Benedetto Casillo as don Luigi
Paco De Rosa as Inspector Parisi

References

External links

2017 films
Films directed by Carlo Vanzina
2010s Italian-language films
2017 comedy films
Italian comedy films
2010s Italian films